WCCR-LP (94.5 FM) is a low power college radio station owned and operated by University of the Cumberlands in Williamsburg, Kentucky.  Founded in 2004, it was a 24-hours a day student-run radio station. It went dark on April 29, 2022.

Overview

WCCR's studio is located in the second floor of the Grace Crum Rollins Fine Arts Center at the university.

The station has been expanding in the years since the grand launch in 2004, from having a limited amount of musical selections in its library to having an extensive Rock/Pop section as well as Country, Bluegrass, Contemporary Christian, Jazz, Christmas tunes, and many other sections of musical genres. The station opens at 8 AM every morning on Monday through Friday, and beyond 9 or 10 PM every night and on weekends, "Overnight" music is played in loops or through a genre server until a live member of the staff can assume control of the station. The station only reaches a ten-mile radius from having a low-power transmitter, but is commercial free and request-friendly.

As of August 2008, the station began streaming audio broadcasts through the official WCCR website (see link below). The audio can be heard through both Windows Media and QuickTime formats.

Gallery

External links
 
 

CCR-LP
CCR-LP
CCR-LP
2004 establishments in Kentucky